The 1992–93 NBA season was the Pacers' 17th season in the National Basketball Association, and 26th season as a franchise. In the off-season, the Pacers acquired Pooh Richardson and Sam Mitchell from the Minnesota Timberwolves. The team played mediocre basketball once again, losing six straight games between December and January after a 13–10 start, then went on a 7-game losing streak in February, and held a 23–28 record at the All-Star break. However, they would recover and play above .500 for the remainder of the season. On the final day of the regular season, the Pacers defeated the Miami Heat, 94–88 at home on April 24, finishing fifth in the Central Division with a 41–41 record, and winning a tie-breaker over the Orlando Magic for the #8 seed in the Eastern Conference.

Reggie Miller led the team in scoring averaging 21.2 points per game, and tied in first place in the league with 167 three-point field goals, while 2-time Sixth Man of the Year Detlef Schrempf averaged 19.1 points, 9.5 rebounds and 6.0 assists per game in his first season as a starter, and was selected for the 1993 NBA All-Star Game. In addition, Rik Smits provided the team with 14.3 points and 5.3 rebounds per game, while Richardson contributed 10.4 points and 7.7 assists per game, second-year forward Dale Davis provided with 8.9 points, 8.8 rebounds and 1.8 blocks per game, and Vern Fleming contributed 9.5 points and 3.0 assists per game off the bench.

However, in the Eastern Conference First Round of the playoffs, the Pacers would lose in four games to the top-seeded New York Knicks. This was the fourth consecutive year that the Pacers lost in the opening round of the playoffs. Following the season, Schrempf was traded to the Seattle SuperSonics, while head coach Bob Hill was fired, and George McCloud was released to free agency, and left to play overseas in Italy.

Draft picks

Roster

Regular season

Season standings

y - clinched division title
x - clinched playoff spot

z - clinched division title
y - clinched division title
x - clinched playoff spot

Record vs. opponents

Game log

Regular season

|- align="center" bgcolor="#ffcccc"
| 1
| November 7, 1992
| Detroit
| L 87–89
|
|
|
| Market Square Arena
| 0–1
|- align="center" bgcolor="#ffcccc"
| 2
| November 9, 1992
| @ Chicago
| L 97–102
|
|
|
| Chicago Stadium
| 0–2
|- align="center" bgcolor="#ccffcc"
| 3
| November 11, 1992
| Philadelphia
| W 120–114
|
|
|
| Market Square Arena
| 1–2
|- align="center" bgcolor="#ccffcc"
| 4
| November 13, 1992
| Charlotte
| W 110–109
|
|
|
| Market Square Arena
| 2–2
|- align="center" bgcolor="#ccffcc"
| 5
| November 14, 1992
| @ Detroit
| W 104–100
|
|
|
| The Palace of Auburn Hills
| 3–2
|- align="center" bgcolor="#ccffcc"
| 6
| November 17, 1992
| Denver
| W 128–98
|
|
|
| Market Square Arena
| 4–2
|- align="center" bgcolor="#ffcccc"
| 7
| November 20, 1992
| Utah
| L 95–97
|
|
|
| Market Square Arena
| 4–3
|- align="center" bgcolor="#ffcccc"
| 8
| November 21, 1992
| @ Milwaukee
| L 95–105
|
|
|
| Bradley Center
| 4–4
|- align="center" bgcolor="#ccffcc"
| 9
| November 24, 1992
| Miami
| W 114–82
|
|
|
| Market Square Arena
| 5–4
|- align="center" bgcolor="#ffcccc"
| 10
| November 25, 1992
| @ Miami
| L 93–110
|
|
|
| Miami Arena
| 5–5
|- align="center" bgcolor="#ffcccc"
| 11
| November 27, 1992
| Orlando
| L 116–130
|
|
|
| Market Square Arena
| 5–6
|- align="center" bgcolor="#ccffcc"
| 12
| November 28, 1992
| @ Charlotte
| W 134–122
|
|
|
| Charlotte Coliseum
| 6–6

|- align="center" bgcolor="#ffcccc"
| 13
| December 1, 1992
| @ Atlanta
| L 107–119
|
|
|
| The Omni
| 6–7
|- align="center" bgcolor="#ffcccc"
| 14
| December 2, 1992
| Portland
| L 103–112
|
|
|
| Market Square Arena
| 6–8
|- align="center" bgcolor="#ccffcc"
| 15
| December 4, 1992
| Atlanta
| W 122–106
|
|
|
| Market Square Arena
| 7–8
|- align="center" bgcolor="#ccffcc"
| 16
| December 5, 1992
| @ Washington
| W 111–109
|
|
|
| Capital Centre
| 8–8
|- align="center" bgcolor="#ccffcc"
| 17
| December 8, 1992
| @ Golden State
| W 125–115
|
|
|
| Oakland-Alameda County Coliseum Arena
| 9–8
|- align="center" bgcolor="#ccffcc"
| 18
| December 10, 1992
| @ Sacramento
| W 106–99
|
|
|
| ARCO Arena
| 10–8
|- align="center" bgcolor="#ccffcc"
| 19
| December 11, 1992
| @ Portland
| W 134–124 (2OT)
|
|
|
| Memorial Coliesum
| 11–8
|- align="center" bgcolor="#ffcccc"
| 20
| December 13, 1992
| @ L.A. Clippers
| L 101–112
|
|
|
| Los Angeles Memorial Sports Arena
| 11–9
|- align="center" bgcolor="#ccffcc"
| 21
| December 16, 1992
| Boston
| W 114–91
|
|
|
| Market Square Arena
| 12–9
|- align="center" bgcolor="#ffcccc"
| 22
| December 18, 1992
| @ Detroit
| L 106–122
|
|
|
| The Palace of Auburn Hills
| 12–10
|- align="center" bgcolor="#ccffcc"
| 23
| December 19, 1992
| New Jersey
| W 124–110
|
|
|
| Market Square Arena
| 13–10
|- align="center" bgcolor="#ffcccc"
| 24
| December 21, 1992
| @ Philadelphia
| L 101–113
|
|
|
| The Spectrum
| 13–11
|- align="center" bgcolor="#ffcccc"
| 25
| December 23, 1992
| @ Cleveland
| L 104–118
|
|
|
| Richfield Coliseum
| 13–12
|- align="center" bgcolor="#ffcccc"
| 26
| December 26, 1992
| Chicago
| L 84–95
|
|
|
| Market Square Arena
| 13–13
|- align="center" bgcolor="#ffcccc"
| 27
| December 29, 1992
| @ New York
| L 91–97
|
|
|
| Madison Square Garden
| 13–14
|- align="center" bgcolor="#ffcccc"
| 28
| December 30, 1992
| New York
| L 90–94
|
|
|
| Market Square Arena
| 13–15

|- align="center" bgcolor="#ffcccc"
| 29
| January 2, 1993
| @ Chicago
| L 100–109
|
|
|
| Chicago Stadium
| 13–16
|- align="center" bgcolor="#ccffcc"
| 30
| January 5, 1993
| L.A. Clippers
| W 114–106
|
|
|
| Market Square Arena
| 14–16
|- align="center" bgcolor="#ffcccc"
| 31
| January 6, 1993
| @ Boston
| L 94–103
|
|
|
| Boston Garden
| 14–17
|- align="center" bgcolor="#ccffcc"
| 32
| January 9, 1993
| @ Orlando
| W 104–88
|
|
|
| Orlando Arena
| 15–17
|- align="center" bgcolor="#ccffcc"
| 33
| January 12, 1993
| Philadelphia
| W 112–93
|
|
|
| Market Square Arena
| 16–17
|- align="center" bgcolor="#ffcccc"
| 34
| January 15, 1993
| Cleveland
| L 120–132
|
|
|
| Market Square Arena
| 16–18
|- align="center" bgcolor="#ccffcc"
| 35
| January 16, 1993
| Golden State
| W 117–116
|
|
|
| Market Square Arena
| 17–18
|- align="center" bgcolor="#ffcccc"
| 36
| January 18, 1993
| @ New Jersey
| L 97–100
|
|
|
| Brendan Byrne Arena
| 17–19
|- align="center" bgcolor="#ccffcc"
| 37
| January 19, 1993
| Washington
| W 116–96
|
|
|
| Market Square Arena
| 18–19
|- align="center" bgcolor="#ffcccc"
| 38
| January 21, 1993
| Milwaukee
| L 108–110
|
|
|
| Market Square Arena
| 18–20
|- align="center" bgcolor="#ffcccc"
| 39
| January 23, 1993
| Houston
| L 100–113
|
|
|
| Market Square Arena
| 18–21
|- align="center" bgcolor="#ccffcc"
| 40
| January 24, 1993
| @ Charlotte
| W 112–105
|
|
|
| Charlotte Coliseum
| 19–21
|- align="center" bgcolor="#ccffcc"
| 41
| January 27, 1993
| @ Philadelphia
| W 127–125 (OT)
|
|
|
| The Spectrum
| 20–21
|- align="center" bgcolor="#ccffcc"
| 42
| January 28, 1993
| L.A. Lakers
| W 127–110
|
|
|
| Market Square Arena
| 21–21
|- align="center" bgcolor="#ccffcc"
| 43
| January 30, 1993
| Detroit
| W 110–106
|
|
|
| Market Square Arena
| 22–21

|- align="center" bgcolor="#ffcccc"
| 44
| February 2, 1993
| @ Houston
| L 104–115
|
|
|
| The Summit
| 22–22
|- align="center" bgcolor="#ffcccc"
| 45
| February 4, 1993
| @ San Antonio
| L 115–133
|
|
|
| HemisFair Arena
| 22–23
|- align="center" bgcolor="#ffcccc"
| 46
| February 5, 1993
| @ Dallas
| L 104–105
|
|
|
| Reunion Arena
| 22–24
|- align="center" bgcolor="#ffcccc"
| 47
| February 10, 1993
| Chicago
| L 104–115
|
|
|
| Market Square Arena
| 22–25
|- align="center" bgcolor="#ffcccc"
| 48
| February 12, 1993
| Minnesota
| L 100–102
|
|
|
| Market Square Arena
| 22–26
|- align="center" bgcolor="#ffcccc"
| 49
| February 13, 1993
| @ Milwaukee
| L 115–117
|
|
|
| Bradley Center
| 22–27
|- align="center" bgcolor="#ffcccc"
| 50
| February 15, 1993
| @ Cleveland
| L 105–110
|
|
|
| Richfield Coliseum
| 22–28
|- align="center" bgcolor="#ccffcc"
| 51
| February 17, 1993
| Sacramento
| W 125–99
|
|
|
| Market Square Arena
| 23–28
|- align="center"
|colspan="9" bgcolor="#bbcaff"|All-Star Break
|- style="background:#cfc;"
|- bgcolor="#bbffbb"
|- align="center" bgcolor="#ccffcc"
| 52
| February 23, 1993
| Boston
| W 113–86
|
|
|
| Market Square Arena
| 24–28
|- align="center" bgcolor="#ffcccc"
| 53
| February 24, 1993
| @ Washington
| L 101–105
|
|
|
| Capital Centre
| 24–29
|- align="center" bgcolor="#ccffcc"
| 54
| February 26, 1993
| Charlotte
| W 137–105
|
|
|
| Market Square Arena
| 25–29
|- align="center" bgcolor="#ccffcc"
| 55
| February 28, 1993
| Dallas
| W 110–96
|
|
|
| Market Square Arena
| 26–29

|- align="center" bgcolor="#ccffcc"
| 56
| March 2, 1993
| San Antonio
| W 109–95
|
|
|
| Market Square Arena
| 27–29
|- align="center" bgcolor="#ccffcc"
| 57
| March 4, 1993
| Atlanta
| W 136–111
|
|
|
| Market Square Arena
| 28–29
|- align="center" bgcolor="#ffcccc"
| 58
| March 7, 1993
| @ Miami
| L 99–114
|
|
|
| Miami Arena
| 28–30
|- align="center" bgcolor="#ccffcc"
| 59
| March 8, 1993
| Seattle
| W 105–99
|
|
|
| Market Square Arena
| 29–30
|- align="center" bgcolor="#ffcccc"
| 60
| March 10, 1993
| @ Orlando
| L 106–119
|
|
|
| Orlando Arena
| 29–31
|- align="center" bgcolor="#ffcccc"
| 61
| March 14, 1993
| @ New York
| L 90–121
|
|
|
| Madison Square Garden
| 29–32
|- align="center" bgcolor="#ccffcc"
| 62
| March 17, 1993
| Milwaukee
| W 114–91
|
|
|
| Market Square Arena
| 30–32
|- align="center" bgcolor="#ccffcc"
| 63
| March 19, 1993
| Charlotte
| W 112–108
|
|
|
| Market Square Arena
| 31–32
|- align="center" bgcolor="#ccffcc"
| 64
| March 21, 1993
| @ Phoenix
| W 109–108
|
|
|
| America West Arena
| 32–32
|- align="center" bgcolor="#ffcccc"
| 65
| March 23, 1993
| @ Utah
| L 101–119
|
|
|
| Delta Center
| 32–33
|- align="center" bgcolor="#ccffcc"
| 66
| March 25, 1993
| @ Seattle
| W 120–117
|
|
|
| Seattle Center Coliseum
| 33–33
|- align="center" bgcolor="#ffcccc"
| 67
| March 27, 1993
| @ Denver
| L 106–123
|
|
|
| McNichols Sports Arena
| 33–34
|- align="center" bgcolor="#ffcccc"
| 68
| March 28, 1993
| @ L.A. Lakers
| L 90–92
|
|
|
| Great Western Forum
| 33–35
|- align="center" bgcolor="#ccffcc"
| 69
| March 31, 1993
| Washington
| W 114–95
|
|
|
| Market Square Arena
| 34–35

|- align="center" bgcolor="#ccffcc"
| 70
| April 2, 1993
| Orlando
| W 118–102
|
|
|
| Market Square Arena
| 35–35
|- align="center" bgcolor="#ffcccc"
| 71
| April 4, 1993
| Phoenix
| L 100–110
|
|
|
| Market Square Arena
| 35–36
|- align="center" bgcolor="#ccffcc"
| 72
| April 6, 1993
| @ New Jersey
| W 98–85
|
|
|
| Brendan Byrne Arena
| 36–36
|- align="center" bgcolor="#ccffcc"
| 73
| April 7, 1993
| @ Minnesota
| W 113–105
|
|
|
| Target Center
| 37–36
|- align="center" bgcolor="#ffcccc"
| 74
| April 10, 1993
| Chicago
| L 87–92
|
|
|
| Market Square Arena
| 37–37
|- align="center" bgcolor="#ffcccc"
| 75
| April 13, 1993
| @ Boston
| L 90–96
|
|
|
| Boston Garden
| 37–38
|- align="center" bgcolor="#ccffcc"
| 76
| April 14, 1993
| New Jersey
| W 109–90
|
|
|
| Market Square Arena
| 38–38
|- align="center" bgcolor="#ccffcc"
| 77
| April 16, 1993
| New York
| W 100–94
|
|
|
| Market Square Arena
| 39–38
|- align="center" bgcolor="#ccffcc"
| 78
| April 18, 1993
| @ Milwaukee
| W 108–98
|
|
|
| Bradley Center
| 40–38
|- align="center" bgcolor="#ffcccc"
| 79
| April 20, 1993
| @ Atlanta
| L 102–111
|
|
|
| The Omni
| 40–39
|- align="center" bgcolor="#ffcccc"
| 80
| April 21, 1993
| Cleveland
| L 95–111
|
|
|
| Market Square Arena
| 40–40
|- align="center" bgcolor="#ffcccc"
| 81
| April 23, 1993
| @ Detroit
| L 104–109
|
|
|
| The Palace of Auburn Hills
| 40–41
|- align="center" bgcolor="#ccffcc"
| 82
| April 24, 1993
| Miami
| W 94–88
|
|
|
| Market Square Arena
| 41–41

Playoffs

|- align="center" bgcolor="#ffcccc"
| 1
| April 30, 1993
| @ New York
| L 104–107
| Reggie Miller (36)
| LaSalle Thompson (7)
| George McCloud (6)
| Madison Square Garden19,763
| 0–1
|- align="center" bgcolor="#ffcccc"
| 2
| May 2, 1993
| @ New York
| L 91–101
| Rik Smits (29)
| Dale Davis (9)
| Detlef Schrempf (7)
| Madison Square Garden19,763
| 0–2
|- align="center" bgcolor="#ccffcc"
| 3
| May 4, 1993
| New York
| W 116–93
| Reggie Miller (36)
| Rik Smits (8)
| Pooh Richardson (9)
| Market Square Arena11,380
| 1–2
|- align="center" bgcolor="#ffcccc"
| 4
| May 6, 1993
| New York
| L 100–109 (OT)
| Reggie Miller (33)
| Smits, Davis (12)
| Pooh Richardson (8)
| Market Square Arena13,059
| 1–3
|-

Player Statistics

Season

Playoffs

Player Statistics Citation:

Awards and records
 Detlef Schrempf, NBA All-Star Game

Transactions

See also
 1992-93 NBA season

References

Indiana Pacers seasons
Pace
Pace
Indiana